Counties 4 Surrey is a rugby union competition covering the English county of Surrey and parts of south-west London. It sits at the 10th tier of the English rugby union system. The teams play home and away matches from September through to April. Promoted teams move up to Surrey 3 and relegated teams move down to Counties 5 Surrey. At the end of the 1999–2000 season, Surrey 4 was cancelled with teams automatically going up to Surrey 3 or dropping out of the league. After a hiatus of four seasons the division was reinstated.

Each year some of the clubs in this division also take part in the RFU Junior Vase – a level 9–11 national competition.

Teams for 2021–22
The teams competing in 2021–22 achieved their places in the league based on performances in 2019-20, the 'previous season' column in the table below refers to that season.

Season 2020–21
On 30th October the RFU announced that a decision had been taken to cancel Adult Competitive Leagues (National League 1 and below) for the 2020–21 season meaning Surrey 4 was not contested.

Teams for 2019–20

Teams for 2018–19

Teams for 2017–18

Teams for 2016–17
Egham Hollowegians
Haslemere
Horley 
Mitcham & Carshalton (relegated from Surrey 3)
Old Glynonians (relegated from Surrey 3)
Old Oundelians
Old Suttonians
Raynes Park 
Wandsworthians	
Woking

Teams for 2015–16
Egham Hollowegians
Haslemere
Horley 
Old Haileyburians 
Old Johnians
Old Oundelians
Old Suttonians
Raynes Park 
Wandsworthians	
Woking

Teams for 2014–15
Egham Hollowegians
Haslemere
Horley (transfer from Sussex)
Old Haileyburians (relegated from Surrey 3)
Old Oundelians
Raynes Park (relegated from Surrey 3)
Reeds Weybridge
Reigate	
Wandsworthians	
Woking

Teams for 2013–14
Egham Hollowegians
Haslemere
Merton
Old Georgians
Old Oundelians
Reeds Weybridge
Reigate
Wandsworthians
Woking

Teams for 2012–13
Egham Hollowegians
Haslemere
Merton
Metropolitan Police
Old Glynonians	
Old Oundelians	
Reeds Weybridge	
Wandsworthians	
Woking

Teams for 2011–12
Egham Hollowegians
Guildfordians
Lightwater
Merton
Metropolitan Police
Old Glynonians
Old Oundelians
Reigate
Wandsworthians
Woking

Teams for 2010–11
Egham Hollowegians
Guildfordians
Haslemere
Lightwater
Old Oundelians
Reigate
Streatham & Croydon
Wandsworthians
Woking

Teams for 2009–10
London Economicals
Egham Hollowegians
Guildfordians RFC
Old Glynonians
Lightwater RFC
Reigate
Wandsworthians
Woking

Surrey Reserve League 1st XV's
Below Surrey 4 there is the Surrey Reserve Leagues this is for Surrey teams 2XV's and below, there are some 1XVs playing here.
Old Johnians
Racal Decca
Esher Amateurs
Old Suttonians
Lightwater
South Godstone Stags

Original teams
When this division was introduced in 1988 it contained the following teams:

British Aerospace
Economicals
Lightwater
Oxted
Racal-Decca
Royal Holloway College
University of Surrey

Surrey 4 honours

Surrey 4 (1988–1993)
The original Surrey 4 was tier 11 league with promotion to Surrey 3 and relegation to Surrey 5, until that division was cancelled at the end of the 1991–92 season.

Surrey 4 (1993–1996)
The creation of National 5 South meant that Surrey 4 dropped from a tier 11 league to a tier 12 league for the years that National 5 South was active.  Promotion was to Surrey 3 and there was no relegation as Surrey 4 was at the lowest level of the league structure.

Surrey 4 (1996–2000)
The cancellation of National 5 South at the end of the 1995–96 season meant that Surrey 4 reverted to being a tier 11 league. Promotion continued to Surrey 3 and there was no relegation. Surrey 4 was cancelled at the end of the 1999–00 season, with the majority of teams transferring to Surrey 3 or dropping out of the league system.

Surrey 4 (2005–2009)
Surrey 4 was reintroduced as a tier 12 league for the 2005–06 season. Promotion was to Surrey 3 and, as the division was at the lowest level of the English league system, there was no relegation.

Surrey 4 (2009–present)
Surrey 4 remained a tier 12 league despite national restructuring by the RFU. Promotion continued to Surrey 3 and there was no relegation.

Number of league titles

Haslemere (2)
Old Bevonians (2)
Old Glynonians (2)
Streatham-Croydon (2)
University of Surrey (2)
CL London (1)
Croydon (1)
Egham (1)
Guildfordians (1)
Horley (1)
Kew Occasionals (1)
King's College Hospital (1)
London Fire Brigade (1)
Merton (1)
Old Abingdonians (1)
Old Caterhamians (1)
Old Georgians (1)
Old Haileyburians (1)
Old Oundelians (1)
Old Suttonians (1)
Pelhamians (1)
Reeds Weybridge (1)
Woking (1)

Notes

See also
London & SE Division RFU
Surrey RFU
English rugby union system
Rugby union in England

References

External links
Surrey Rugby Football Union

Rugby union leagues in England
Rugby union in Surrey